= 1904–05 Wyoming Cowboys basketball team =

American college basketball season

1904–05 Wyoming Cowboys basketball
- Conference: Independent
- Record: 1–0
- Head coach: W. Yates (1st season)

The 1904–05 Wyoming Cowboys basketball team represented the University of Wyoming during the 1904–05 college basketball season. Coached by W. Yates in their first ever season, the Cowboys went 1–0, winning their lone game on April 21 against Laramie Town Team by a score of 17–5.
